Colonel (later General) Denzil Onslow (12 September 1770 – 21 August 1838) was a British soldier and politician. He was born at Marylebone, London, the son of the British Member of Parliament Middleton Onslow.

Career and family
Onslow was a colonel and later a general in the Grenadier Guards. His daughter, Amelia, married Thomas Chamberlayne, who played cricket for Hampshire; their son Tankerville Chamberlayne also had a brief career as a cricketer, and was Member of Parliament for the Southampton constituency three times. The main road through Bevois Valley was named Onslow Road after Onslow as was nearby Denzil Avenue.

In 1833, Onslow was living at Great Staughton and was appointed High Sheriff of Cambridgeshire and Huntingdonshire. He died in 1838 at Huntingdon.

Cricket
Onslow was also an amateur cricketer who made nine known appearances in high-level matches from 1796 to 1807. He was mainly associated with Marylebone Cricket Club (MCC) but also represented other teams.

References

1770 births
1838 deaths
British Army generals
English cricketers
English cricketers of 1787 to 1825
Marylebone Cricket Club cricketers
Hampshire cricketers
High Sheriffs of Cambridgeshire and Huntingdonshire
People from Marylebone
People from Great Staughton
Denzil
Lord Yarmouth's XI cricketers
Colonel C. Lennox's XI cricketers
Military personnel from London